Massacre River is a 1949 American western film directed by John Rawlins and starring Rory Calhoun, Guy Madison and Carole Mathews. The film's sets were designed by Lucius O. Croxton. It was distributed by Allied Artists.

Cast 
 Guy Madison as 1st. Lt. Larry Knight
 Rory Calhoun as 1st. Lt. Phil Acton
 Johnny Sands as 2nd Lt. Randy Reid
 Art Baker as Col. James Reid
 Carole Mathews as Laura Jordan
 Cathy Downs as Kitty Reid
 Emory Parnell as Sgt. Johnanssen
 Steve Brodie as Burke Kimber
 Iron Eyes Cody as Chief Yellowstone
 Eddy Waller as Joe
 Douglas Fowley as Simms

References

Bibliography
 Pitts, Michael R. Western Movies: A Guide to 5,105 Feature Films. McFarland, 2012.

External links 
 
 Massacre River at TCMDB

1949 films
1949 Western (genre) films
American Western (genre) films
American black-and-white films
Films directed by John Rawlins
Allied Artists films
Films based on American novels
1940s American films